Events in the year 1980 in Japan. It corresponds to Shōwa 55 (昭和55年) in the Japanese calendar.

Incumbents
Emperor: Hirohito (Emperor Shōwa)
Prime Minister:
Masayoshi Ōhira (L–Kagawa), until June 12
Zenkō Suzuki (L–Iwate), from July 17
 Chief Cabinet Secretary and acting Prime Minister from June 12 to July 17: Masayoshi Itō (L–Fukushima) until July 17, Kiichi Miyazawa (L–Hiroshima)
 Chief Justice of the Supreme Court: Takaaki Hattori
 President of the House of Representatives: Hirokichi Nadao (L–Hiroshima) until May 19, Hajime Fukuda (L–Fukui) from July 17
 President of the House of Councillors: Ken Yasui (L–Tokyo) until July 7, Masatoshi Tokunaga (L–national) from July 17
 Diet sessions: 91st (regular session opened in December 1979, to May 19), 92nd (special, July 17 to July 26), 93rd (extraordinary, September 29 to November 29), 94th (regular, December 22 to 1981, June 6)

Governors
Aichi Prefecture: Yoshiaki Nakaya 
Akita Prefecture: Kikuji Sasaki 
Aomori Prefecture: Masaya Kitamura 
Chiba Prefecture: Kiichi Kawakami 
Ehime Prefecture: Haruki Shiraishi 
Fukui Prefecture: Heidayū Nakagawa 
Fukuoka Prefecture: Hikaru Kamei 
Fukushima Prefecture: Isao Matsudaira 
Gifu Prefecture: Yosuke Uematsu 
Gunma Prefecture: Ichiro Shimizu 
Hiroshima Prefecture: Hiroshi Miyazawa 
Hokkaido: Naohiro Dōgakinai 
Hyogo Prefecture: Tokitada Sakai
Ibaraki Prefecture: Fujio Takeuchi 
Ishikawa Prefecture: Yōichi Nakanishi 
Iwate Prefecture: 
Kagawa Prefecture: Tadao Maekawa 
Kagoshima Prefecture: Kaname Kamada 
Kanagawa Prefecture: Kazuji Nagasu 
Kochi Prefecture: Chikara Nakauchi  
Kumamoto Prefecture: Issei Sawada 
Kyoto Prefecture: Yukio Hayashida 
Mie Prefecture: Ryōzō Tagawa 
Miyagi Prefecture: Sōichirō Yamamoto 
Miyazaki Prefecture: Suketaka Matsukata 
Nagano Prefecture: Gon'ichirō Nishizawa (until 11 September); Gorō Yoshimura (starting 26 October)
Nagasaki Prefecture: Kan'ichi Kubo 
Nara Prefecture: Ryozo Okuda (until 30 September); Shigekiyo Ueda (starting 26 October)
Niigata Prefecture: Takeo Kimi 
Oita Prefecture: Morihiko Hiramatsu 
Okayama Prefecture: Shiro Nagano 
Okinawa Prefecture: Junji Nishime 
Osaka Prefecture: Sakae Kishi
Saga Prefecture: Kumao Katsuki 
Saitama Prefecture: Yawara Hata 
Shiga Prefecture: Masayoshi Takemura 
Shiname Prefecture: Seiji Tsunematsu 
Shizuoka Prefecture: Keizaburō Yamamoto 
Tochigi Prefecture: Yuzuru Funada 
Tokushima Prefecture: Yasunobu Takeichi 
Tokyo: Shun'ichi Suzuki 
Tottori Prefecture: Kōzō Hirabayashi 
Toyama Prefecture: Kokichi Nakada (until 18 September); Yutaka Nakaoki (starting 8 November)
Wakayama Prefecture: Shirō Kariya  
Yamagata Prefecture: Seiichirō Itagaki 
Yamaguchi Prefecture: Toru Hirai 
Yamanashi Prefecture: Kōmei Mochizuki

Events
January 6 – According to Japan National Police Agency official confirmed report, Hayakawa wire bridge collapse by human stampede in Saito, Miyazaki Prefecture, seven persons were crush to death, 15 persons were wounded.
January 16 - Paul McCartney is arrested at Narita airport for possession of drugs.
April Unknown date – Fancl Cosmetics, as predecessor of FANCL was founded.
April 24 - Nintendo releases the first portable game console, the Game&Watch. 
June 22
1980 Japanese general election
1980 Japanese House of Councillors election
August 14 - A rock fall hit mountaineers in Mount Fuji, Yamanashi Prefecture, according to official results report, 12 fatalities, with 29 injured. 
August 16 - A gas explosion occurs in the underground shopping area of Shizuoka Station, killing 200.
August 19 - 1980 Shinjuku bus fire, according to official confirmed report, 6 person fatalities with 15 were wounded.  
November 19 - A fire at the Kawaji Prince Hotel in Fujihara, Tochigi Prefecture kills 40.

Popular culture

Arts and entertainment
In film, Zigeunerweisen by Seijun Suzuki won the Best film award at the Japan Academy Prize and the Yokohama Film Festival, Kagemusha by Akira Kurosawa won Best film at the Hochi Film Awards, the Blue Ribbon Awards and the Mainichi Film Award. For a list of Japanese films released in 1980 see Japanese films of 1980.

In manga,  the winners of the Shogakukan Manga Award were Hakatakko Junjō and Gangaragan by Hōsei Hasegawa and Chie the Brat by Etsumi Haruki (general) and Urusei Yatsura by  Rumiko Takahashi (shōnen or shōjo). Susano Oh by Go Nagai (shōnen) and Lemon Report by Mayumi Yoshida (shōjo) won the Kodansha Manga Award. For a list of manga released in 1980 see :Category:1980 manga.

In music, the 31st Kōhaku Uta Gassen was won by the Red Team (women). Hiroshi Itsuki won the FNS Music Festival.

In television, see: 1980 in Japanese television.

Japan hosted the Miss International 1980 beauty pageant, won by Costa Rican Lorna Chávez.

Sports
In football (soccer) Yanmar Diesel won the Japan Soccer League. For the champions of the regional leagues see: 1980 Japanese Regional Leagues. For more see: 1980 in Japanese football.

At the Winter Olympics Japan won a silver medal.

Births

January–June

 January 6: Hiromi Oshima, model
 January 13: Akira Kaji, football player
 January 14:
 Hiroshi Tamaki, actor, model and singer
 Sosuke Sumitani, announcer
 Yūko Kaida, voice actress
 January 21: Nana Mizuki, voice actress and singer
 January 23: Nana Natsume, AV idol and celebrity
 January 26: Sanae Kobayashi, voice actress and singer
 February 4: Kenta Kiritani, actor and singer  
 February 6: Mamiko Noto, voice actress and singer
 February 17: Aya Endō, voice actress
 February 20: Yuichi Nakamura, voice actor
 February 21: Kayoko Shibata, actress
 March 8: Kazuyuki Okitsu, voice actor 
March 31: Maaya Sakamoto, voice actress and singer
April 1: Yūko Takeuchi, actress (d. 2020)
 April 2: Yuya Shirai, mixed martial artist
 April 3: Yūko Ishibashi, singer
 April 7: Mr. C.B., thoroughbred racehorse (d. 2002)
 April 14: Ayumi Ito, actress 
 April 15: Futoshi Uehara, musician 
 April 21: Hiro Shimono, voice actor
 April 25: Juri Miyazawa, actress and gravure idol 
 May 9: Norihiro Nishi, footballer
 May 10: Mayumi Kawasaki, race walker
 May 20: Chinatsu Mori, shot putter (d. 2006)
May 22: Rena Tanaka, actress
 May 31:
Mika Katsumura, actress
Akitoshi Tamura, mixed martial artist
 June 1: Mitsuru Chiyotanda, football player
 June 2: Shingo Suetsugu, sprinter
 June 3: Keiji Suzuki, judoka
 June 9: Kana Ueda, voice actress
 June 17: Kimeru, singer  
 June 25: Nozomi Takeuchi, actress 
 June 27: Takahiro Futagawa, football player

July –December

 July 15
Masayuki Hirahara, pianist and composer
BxB Hulk, professional wrestler 
 July 17: Masato Yoshino, professional wrestler 
 July 18: Ryōko Hirosue, actress and pop star
 July 22: Hisashi Mizutori, gymnast
 July 28: Harumi Nemoto, gravure idol
 July 30: Ayako Uehara, classical pianist
 July 31: Rina Aiuchi, singer
 August 1: Yoichi Mori, football player
 August 14: Yusuke Kawaguchi, mixed martial artist
 August 29: Daisuke Saito, football player
 September 4: Hitomi Shimatani,  pop singer
 September 8: Mai Kadowaki, voice actress
 September 13: Daisuke Matsuzaka, baseball player  
 September 19: Jun Natsukawa, gravure idol
 September 27: Asashōryū Akinori, sumo wrestler. 
 September 30: Arisa Ogasawara,  voice actress
 October 11: Tomokazu Sugita, voice actor 
 October 13: Salyu, singer
 October 16: Takehito Shigehara, football player
 October 30: Chihiro Onitsuka, singer-songwriter
 November 4: Kanako Naito, volleyball player (d. 2019)
 November 18: Junichi Okada, singer, actor
 November 21: Hiroyuki Tomita, gymnast
 November 26: Satoshi Ohno, singer, actor
 December 5: Shizuka Itō, voice actress
 December 6: Kei Yasuda, singer, musician and actress
 December 13: Satoshi Tsumabuki, actor
 December 16: Daito Takahashi, Nordic combined skier
 December 23: Ayako Ito, announcer

Deaths
 January 4: Shohachi Ishii, wrestler
 January 23: Shōjirō Iida, general
 February 14: Kitsuju Ayabe, general
 February 22: Sadaaki Akamatsu, officer and ace fighter pilot in the Imperial Japanese Navy
 February 27: Shin'ichi Hisamatsu, philosopher
 March 16: Susumu Kimura, admiral in the Imperial Japanese Navy
 May 8: Chieko Higashiyama, film actress (b. 1890)
 May 21: Hiroshi Inagaki, filmmaker
 June 12: Masayoshi Ōhira, Prime Minister (died in office) (b. 1910) 
 October 10: Tameichi Hara, Imperial Japanese naval commander
 October 21: Kanjūrō Arashi, actor
 November 2: Yamakawa Kikue, activist, writer, socialist, and feminist (b. 1890)
 November 30: Mieko Fukui, basketball player (b. 1956)
 December 28: Nobuzo Tohmatsu, admiral in the Imperial Japanese Navy

See also
 1980 in Japanese television
 List of Japanese films of 1980

References

 
Japan
Years of the 20th century in Japan
Japan